Brabson's Ferry Plantation is a Pioneer Century farm and former antebellum plantation near the U.S. city of Sevierville, Tennessee.  Located at what was once a strategic crossing of the French Broad River, by 1860 the plantation had become one of the largest in East Tennessee, and one of the few in the region that rivalled the large plantations of the Deep South in size and influence.  The farm remains in operation, and several of its historic structures— including two plantation houses and an 18th-century plank house— have been added to the National Register of Historic Places.

John Brabson II (1773–1848) established Brabson's Ferry Plantation after purchasing the plantation's namesake ferry in 1798, and acquired the surrounding fertile farmland over subsequent decades.  Brabson's sons continued operating the plantation after his death, and established a business that catered to the ferry's traffic.  As the Brabsons supported the Confederacy during the U.S. Civil War, their plantation was looted by Sevier County Unionists and toward the end of the war most members of the family were forced to flee.  Several eventually returned, however, and by the end of the 19th century had rebuilt the plantation and ferry.  The Brabson family still owns and manages the farm.

Location
Brabson's Ferry Plantation is located at the confluence of Boyds Creek and the French Broad River in the Boyds Creek community a few miles northwest of Sevierville.  State Highway 338 (Boyds Creek Highway, or Old Knoxville Highway) passes along the plantation's southern boundary, and Indian Warpath Road traverses its western section.  The Brabson Cemetery is located atop a steep hill with a sweeping view of the French Broad River on the north end of the plantation.

History

Highway 338 follows what was once a stretch of the Great Indian Warpath, a trail used for centuries by Native Americans travelling up and down the Tennessee Valley.  The ancient path crossed the French Broad River at a ford near the mouth of Boyds Creek.  In 1780, John Sevier crossed at this ford to engage and defeat a Cherokee force at the Battle of Boyds Creek.  In the early 1790s, an early pioneer named Andrew Evans established a ferry and a  farm at the Boyds Creek ford.  John Brabson, who migrated to the area from Frederick County, Virginia, purchased the Evans farm and ferry in 1798.

Brabson continued acquiring land in the early 19th century.  By the time of his death in 1848, he owned , making him one of the largest landholders in East Tennessee.  He was also one of the region's largest slaveholders, with 49 slaves, most of whom were split up among his children (Brabson's will emancipated only one elderly slave).  One of Brabson's sons, Reese Bowen Brabson (1817–1863), moved to Chattanooga in 1848, and was elected to the U.S. Congress in 1858.  John Brabson's daughter, Mary, and son-in-law, Robert H. Hodsden, established the Rose Glen plantation in the 1840s just east of Sevierville.  Brabson's two eldest surviving sons, Benjamin (1809–1866) and Thomas (1813–1894), inherited most of Brabson's Ferry Plantation.  Benjamin and Thomas built more elaborate houses (in 1856 and 1854, respectively), and in 1852 established a company, Brabson and Brother, that operated a general store, tannery, blacksmith shop, gristmill, and stagecoach stop for local farmers and stagecoach traffic using the family's ferry.

While most of Sevier County supported the Union during the U.S. Civil War (96% of the county voted against secession in 1861), the Brabsons supported the Confederacy.  Benjamin Brabson's son, William, enlisted in the Confederate army, and in 1863 was captured by the Union Army while fighting near Muscle Shoals.  Toward the end of the war, as Union forces re-gained control of East Tennessee, vengeful Sevier Countians began harassing and threatening the Brabsons.  Most of the family's livestock were stolen, the plantation houses were looted, and family members were forced to flee.  In an October 1865 letter, Benjamin Brabson's wife, Elizabeth (1821–1894), wrote, "they rocked my house so, burned my carriage, and fired my outbuildings, they also shot at me several times."  Thomas Brabson and his wife moved to Knoxville, where there had been more sympathy for the Confederacy.  Benjamin Brabson moved to Winchester, Tennessee, writing in 1865 that his future looked "dark."  He died a few months later, and, according to his wishes, was buried in Winchester rather than the family cemetery in Boyds Creek.

After Benjamin Brabson's death, his family returned to Sevier County and began rebuilding the family's plantation, largely through the efforts of his son William (1842–1888).  Benjamin's son, John Brabson IV (1858–1943), assumed ownership of the plantation after his mother's death, and made several modifications to the Benjamin Brabson house.  By 1900, Brabson's Ferry had again become a major center of local commerce.  After the death of John Brabson IV, his son Benjamin Davis Brabson III (1905-1982) and his wife, Estalena Rogers Brabson (1912-1989), took over ownership and operation of the farm until Benjamin's death in 1982.  Estalena maintained an enthusiastic interest in genealogy and family history, and published several books, including: John Brabson I, Patriot of the American Revolution And Some of His Descendants (1975) which chronicles the origins of Brabson's Ferry Plantation. Estalena was responsible for placing Brabson's Ferry Plantation on the U.S. National Register of Historic Places in 1975.

The farm is currently managed by Benjamin Brabson's great-grandson, Ben D. Brabson, Jr., and his wife, Elaine, and in 2008 was designated a Tennessee Pioneer Century farm.  The Brabson farm produces beef cattle, wheat, oats, corn, hay, and soybeans.

Historical structures

Brabson's Ferry Plantation contains several notable antebellum structures, including both the Benjamin Brabson and Thomas Brabson houses, a late 18th-century plank house, a frame tannery building, a 19th-century barn, and a late 18th-century log cabin.  The center of the farm, which contains the Benjamin Brabson house, plank house, and barn, is situated along a gravel driveway just off Indian Warpath Road.  The Benjamin Brabson house once overlooked Brabson's Ferry along the French Broad River.  The Thomas Brabson house overlooks the junction of Indian Warpath Road and Highway 338, where the Brabsons' tannery, blacksmith shop, and storehouse once stood.  Slave houses (no longer standing) were once located on the east side of Indian Warpath Road between Highway 338 and the gravel driveway, and at least one once stood between the Benjamin Brabson house and the river.

The Brabson plank house was built by either Andrew Evans or John Brabson sometime between 1790 and 1810.  The plank house was constructed using an odd technique known as piece-sur-piece construction, which involves stacking horizontal planks and tying them in with vertical posts.  In the 19th century, the plank house was moved from its original location and renovated for use as a carriage house.  A large double-door was added to the front, and the chimney was removed.  A hewn log cabin, possibly built by John Brabson in the late 18th century, originally stood near the river but was moved to its present site near the cemetery in the 19th century.

The Thomas Brabson house, built in 1854, is a two-story Federal-style house with a Greek Revival portico.  A 1.5-story kitchen wing is attached to the rear of the house to create an "L" shape.  Square doric columns grace the house's portico.  The Benjamin Brabson house, built in 1856, was originally a Federal-style house similar to the Thomas Brabson house, although a Victorian porch and Queen Anne-style gable were added to the front of the house in the 1890s.  Both houses contain most of their original design elements, including large post-and-lintel mantels and open "dog-leg" staircases.

See also
Wheatlands
Rose Glen

References

External links

John Brabson — entry at Smokykin.com (also contains copy of Brabson's will)
Postcard image of Brabson's Ferry

Houses in Sevier County, Tennessee
Plantations in Tennessee
Plantation houses in Tennessee
Houses on the National Register of Historic Places in Tennessee
Antebellum architecture
Federal architecture in Tennessee
Greek Revival houses in Tennessee
Historic districts on the National Register of Historic Places in Tennessee
Century farms
Farms on the National Register of Historic Places in Tennessee
National Register of Historic Places in Sevier County, Tennessee
1790s establishments in Tennessee